Vere Langford Oliver MRCS FSA (1861 - 1942) was a British surgeon and genealogist. He was a fellow of the Society of Antiquaries of London.

His major work was his Caribbeana published in six volumes between 1909 and 1919.

Selected publications
 The Monumental Inscriptions in the Churches and Churchyards of the Island of Barbados, British West Indies
 The Registers of St. Thomas, Middle Island, St. Kitts: Baptisms, 1729 to 1814; Marriages, 1729 to 1832; Burials, 1729 to 1802
 The History of the Island of Antigua, One of the Leeward Caribbees in the West Indies, from the First Settlement in 1635 to the Present Time
 Caribbeana: Being miscellaneous papers relating to the history, genealogy, topography, and antiquities of the British West Indies. Six vols. Mitchell Hughes & Clarke, London, 1909–19.

References 

British surgeons
Fellows of the Society of Antiquaries of London
1861 births
People from Weymouth, Dorset
British non-fiction writers
British genealogists
1942 deaths